The Joseph Smith Memorial Building, originally called the Hotel Utah, is a social center located on the corner of Main Street and South Temple in Salt Lake City. It is named in honor of Joseph Smith, the founder of the Latter Day Saint movement. It houses several restaurants and also functions as a venue for events. Several levels of the building also serve as administrative offices for the Church of Jesus Christ of Latter-day Saints (LDS Church) departments such as FamilySearch. On January 3, 1978, it was added to the National Register of Historic Places as the Hotel Utah.

History

The corner of Main Street and South Temple has long been important in Utah history. Prior to construction of the Hotel Utah from 1909 to 1911, the general tithing office of the LDS Church, a bishop's storehouse, and the Deseret News printing plant all were located on the site.

Work on the Second Renaissance Revival style hotel, designed by the Los Angeles architectural firm of Parkinson and Bergstrom, began in June 1909. Two years later, on June 9, 1911, the Hotel Utah opened for business. While the LDS Church was the primary stockholder, many Mormon and non-Mormon community and business leaders also purchased stock in the effort to provide the city with a first-class hotel.

"The largest and finest bar in the West [was built] in the basement of the Hotel" to pay off a $2 million construction loan. The financing was secured by the LDS Church's presiding bishop, Charles W. Nibley, from New York financier Charles Baruch.
Originally, the hotel allowed black employees, but no black guests. This policy extended to famous entertainers. Lillian Evanti, Harry Belafonte, Marian Anderson, and Ella Fitzgerald were all denied hotel rooms. Anderson was eventually allowed to stay at the Hotel, on condition that she did not use the elevator and eat her meals in her hotel room.

In 1947, the first non-white professional basketball player, Wataru Misaka, signed his first NBA contract at this hotel.  At the time of his signing, according to Misaka, nonwhites were not allowed to stay in this hotel.

The ten-story building has a concrete and steel structure and is covered with white glazed terra cotta and brick. Various additions and remodelings have occurred throughout the years, including a substantial expansion to the north and modifications to the roof-top dining facilities.

It was featured in the 1973 film "Harry in Your Pocket" starring James Coburn.

The building ceased operations as a hotel in August 1987. A major remodeling and adaptive reuse project to accommodate both community and church functions was completed in 1993.  Church leader Gordon B. Hinckley chose the name when he observed that there were many monuments to pioneer leader and Utah founder Brigham Young, but none to Joseph Smith.

The building was decorated with the words "SALT LAKE 2002" during the Winter Olympics.

2011 marked the celebration of 100 years since initial construction was completed on the Hotel Utah.

Features

The Testaments of One Fold and One Shepherd is a 67-minute film shot in 65 mm and produced by the Church of Jesus Christ of Latter-day Saints.  It depicts the life of Jesus in Jerusalem while depicting the events described in the Book of Mormon from approximately the same time period.  The film's climax occurs after Christ's resurrection, when Jesus appears in the Americas.  The movie was originally shown in the Legacy Theater on a 62x31 foot screen. It replaced Legacy: A Mormon Journey as the flagship JSMB feature in March 2000.  The Testaments of One Fold and One Shepherd was later replaced in the theater by Joseph Smith: The Prophet of the Restoration, a film commemorating the 200th anniversary of the birth of Joseph Smith.

Current use 

The building currently hosts:
 A large, historical, ornately decorated multi-story lobby, featuring a large white statue of Joseph Smith, and an enormous crystal chandelier. Live classical music is often performed here as background.
 The FamilySearch center, where the public can use the provided computers and materials to do family history research and genealogy.
 The Legacy Theater, where the public can view regularly scheduled free showings of various church-produced movies. The theater originally showed Legacy: A Mormon Journey and subsequently has also shown The Testaments of One Fold and One Shepherd, Joseph Smith: Prophet of the Restoration, and Meet the Mormons.
 Two restaurants, The Roof and The Garden, on the top (tenth) floor.
 There is a chapel used for the Sunday services of various downtown wards. The chapel contains a Casavant Frères pipe organ with 2,484 pipes in 45 ranks across two manuals. The organ is characterized by a French accent.
 A pair of peregrine falcons returns yearly to nest in a nest box at the top of the building, which has two webcams installed in it, viewable to the public.

References

External links

 Official Joseph Smith Memorial Building Web Page
 History of the Hotel Utah, Old Post Cards
 Falcon Homepage, Utah Division of Wildlife Resources
 The Roof and The Garden Restaurants, located on the top floor of the Joseph Smith Memorial Building
 Hotel Utah at University of Utah Digital Library, Marriott Library Special Collections

20th-century Latter Day Saint church buildings
Neoclassical architecture in Utah
Defunct hotels in the United States
History of the Church of Jesus Christ of Latter-day Saints
Hotel buildings on the National Register of Historic Places in Utah
Joseph Smith
Meetinghouses of the Church of Jesus Christ of Latter-day Saints in Utah
Office buildings in Salt Lake City
Properties of religious function on the National Register of Historic Places in Utah
Properties of the Church of Jesus Christ of Latter-day Saints
Hotel buildings completed in 1911
Religious buildings and structures completed in 1911
Skyscrapers in Salt Lake City
The Church of Jesus Christ of Latter-day Saints in Utah
1993 establishments in Utah
National Register of Historic Places in Salt Lake City
Skyscraper office buildings in Utah
Skyscrapers in Utah